Aldo Claudio (born 2 December 1997) is an Indonesian professional footballer who plays as a centre-back for Liga 2 club Semen Padang.

Club career

PS Bengkulu
He was signed for PS Bengkulu to play in Liga 2 in the 2017 season.

Persiwa Wamena
In 2018, Claudio signed a one-year contract with Indonesian Liga 2 club Persiwa Wamena.

Persik Kediri
In 2021, Claudio signed for Persik Kediri to play in Liga 1 in the 2021 season. He made his league debut on 27 August 2021, in a 1–0 loss against Bali United as substitute at the Gelora Bung Karno Stadium, Jakarta.

Semen Padang
Claudio was signed for Semen Padang to play in Liga 2 in the 2022–23 season. He made his league debut on 29 August 2022 in a match against PSPS Riau at the Riau Main Stadium, Riau.

Career statistics

Club

References

External links
 Aldo Claudio at Soccerway
 Aldo Claudio at Liga Indonesia

1997 births
Living people
Indonesian footballers
Sportspeople from East Java
Persiwa Wamena players
Persik Kediri players
Liga 1 (Indonesia) players
Liga 2 (Indonesia) players
Association football defenders